Hart is an extinct village on the Santa Fe Railroad in  Russell Township, Macon County, Missouri. The GNIS classifies it as a populated place. A variant name was Evelyn, the name of the local post office. A post office called Evelyn was established in 1888, and remained in operation until 1916. Besides the post office, Hart had a railroad depot.

References

Ghost towns in Missouri
Former populated places in Macon County, Missouri